Ann Dinah Ovenden ( Gilmore, born 1945, Amersham, Buckinghamshire) is a British fine artist and a founder member of the Brotherhood of Ruralists. She is a figurative artist.

Ovenden was educated at the Royal Wanstead School and from 1961, studied at High Wycombe School of Art. She worked as a graphic designer and painter in London, before moving to Cornwall with her then-husband Graham Ovenden in 1973.

In 1975, she was a founding member of the Brotherhood of Ruralists with Graham Ovenden, Peter Blake, David Inshaw, Ann Arnold and her husband Graham Arnold, and Jann Haworth. She has been elected to the St Ives Society of Artists.

Ovenden's paintings have a Romantic rural theme, for example painting portraits of inhabitants of a small Cornwall village. She has had solo exhibitions in Ludlow (1990) and Liskeard (2001).  She has designed theatre sets and props, including for London's Hampstead Garden Opera.

References

External links
 
Examples of work
Homage To Eve show at Wiltshire Heritage Museum
Red Rag Gallery, Bath

1945 births
Living people
20th-century British painters
21st-century British painters
British contemporary artists
Brotherhood of Ruralists
People from Amersham
British women painters
20th-century British women artists
21st-century British women artists